Yoon Kyun-sang (born March 31, 1987) is a South Korean actor who drew attention with his supporting roles in the television series Pinocchio (2014), Six Flying Dragons (2015–2016) and The Doctors (2016). He then played lead roles in The Rebel (2017), Oh, the Mysterious (2018), Clean with Passion for Now (2018), and Class of Lies (2019).

Career
Before becoming an actor, Yoon initially worked as a model. Respecting his father's wishes, he then joined the army and completed his mandatory military service. In 2012, he debuted as an actor, starring in the historical drama Faith. He was then cast in the sports film No Breathing as a swimmer, and as the youngest detective in crime thriller Gap-dong. Yoon achieved acting recognition with his supporting role in the television series, Pinocchio.

In 2015, Yoon starred alongside Ha Ji-won and Lee Jin-wook in The Time We Were Not in Love, a remake of the Taiwanese drama In Time with You.
The same year, he was cast in the historical drama Six Flying Dragons. He played a dim-witted boy who eventually becomes the greatest swordsman of Josen, rising to the head of the royal bodyguard unit that defends the king.

In 2016, Yoon starred in the popular medical drama The Doctors, as an heir to a large corporation, who became a doctor to escape the fight for inheritance. Yoon's acting in Six Flying Dragons earned him a Best New Actor award at the Grimae Awards. Yoon became a cast member of the third season of reality cooking show Three Meals a Day - Fishing Village.

In 2017, Yoon was cast in his first leading role in historical drama The Rebel, as the titular character, Hong Gil-dong. Yoon returned to join the cast of the fourth season of reality cooking show Three Meals a Day - Sea Ranch. Yoon landed his second leading role in SBS' crime drama Oh, the Mysterious.

In 2018, Yoon was cast in the romantic comedy drama Clean with Passion for Now.

In July 2019, he returned to the small screen with school crime drama Class of Lies playing double characters of a lawyer who works undercover as a teacher at an elite high school trying to discover the truth behind a murder.

In 2020, Yoon was the MC of The House Detox, a program about organizing homes, co-hosting with Shin Ae-ra and Park Na-rae.

In 2021, Yoon has confirmed he will join the TVING crime detective drama The Mansion with Lim Ji-yeon, which will air in early 2022 making a comeback two years after 2019.

In January 2022, it was reported that Yoon had terminated his contract with Hooxi Creative. Later the same day, it was reported that Yoon had signed a contract with Management A.M.9. Later on January 6, 2022, it was officially confirmed that Yoon had signed a contract with Management AM9.

Filmography

Film

Television series

Web series

Television Show

Music video

Ambassadorship 
 Jeonju Public Relations Ambassador (2022)

Awards and nominations

References

External links

 Yoon Kyun-sang at Hooxi Entertainment
 Yoon Kyun-sang at Popeye Entertainment 
 
 
 
 

1987 births
Living people
South Korean male television actors
South Korean male film actors